Gunnar Struckmann (born 16 August 1981) is a German former sailor. He competed in the Tornado event at the 2004 Summer Olympics.

References

External links
 

1981 births
Living people
German male sailors (sport)
Olympic sailors of Germany
Sailors at the 2004 Summer Olympics – Tornado
People from Neustadt am Rübenberge
Sportspeople from Lower Saxony